Dresden Zoo or Zoo Dresden, is a zoo situated in the city of Dresden, Germany. It was opened in 1861, making it Germany's fourth oldest zoo. It was originally designed by Peter Joseph Lenné.

The zoo is located on the southern edge of the Großer Garten (Great Garden), a large city centre park. The zoo houses about 3000 animals of almost 400 species, especially Asian animals. It is a member of the World Association of Zoos and Aquariums (WAZA) and the European Association of Zoos and Aquaria (EAZA).

The zoo is served on its southern side by tram lines 9 and 13 of the Dresdner Verkehrsbetriebe, the local municipal transport company. On its northern side is the Zoo station of the Dresdner Parkeisenbahn, a minimum gauge railway through the Großer Garten that is largely operated by children.

In Literature
At the end of the short story "Tobermory" (1909) by Saki, the visiting Englishman Cornelius Appin is killed by an elephant at the Dresden Zoological Garden.

In the novel "Extremely Loud & Incredibly Close" (2005) by Jonathan Safran Foer, the character Thomas Schell is told to shoot all of the carnivores that had escaped from their cages during Dresden's bombing of World War II. He didn't know which were carnivorous and which weren't, so he was told to kill them all. The animals he killed included an elephant, an ape, two lions, a bear cub, a camel, a rhinoceros, a zebra, a giraffe, and a sea lion.

References

External links

Official web site of Dresden Zoo (in German)
Web site of the Friends of Dresden Zoo (in German)

Tourist attractions in Dresden
Zoos in Germany
Buildings and structures in Dresden
Zoos established in 1861
1861 establishments in Saxony